Erik Hægstad (born 26 December 1996) is a Norwegian cross-country mountain biker, born in Drammen. He qualified to represent Norway at the 2020 Summer Olympics in Tokyo 2021, competing in men's cross-country.

Major results
2019
 1st  National XCO Championships
2021
 1st  National XCO Championships

References

External links
 Erik Hægstad at MTB Data
 
 
 
 

1996 births
Living people
People from Drammen
Norwegian male cyclists
Cyclists at the 2020 Summer Olympics
Olympic cyclists of Norway
Norwegian mountain bikers
Cross-country mountain bikers
21st-century Norwegian people